Cellador is an American power metal band based in Denver, Colorado. Originally from Omaha, Nebraska, the band was founded in 2003 by Chris Petersen, the band's primary songwriter, as a direct contrast to the overcrowded metalcore and death metal scenes of the American Midwest. The band has had multiple lineup changes since its inception, but is now rounded out by founder Chris Petersen, drummer Nick McCallister, keyboardist Diego Valadez, and guitarist Eric Meyers. In 2005 the band signed to Metal Blade Records after playing a show with The Black Dahlia Murder.

Biography 
Cellador's debut album Enter Deception was released in 2006. The band recorded the album at Erik Rutan's Mana Studios. In an article from the December 2006 issue of Metal Maniacs magazine, Chris Petersen says he created the band name in reference to a J. R. R. Tolkien essay which stated that the two words cellar and door have an appealing sound when combined. Petersen also said that the band was originally called "Apostate", but the name was later changed to Cellador because he felt it was more fitting for the band.

Cellador has toured across the United States, Canada and Mexico with bands such as Trivium, Bullet for My Valentine, All that Remains, Protest the Hero, The Human Abstract, The Sword, Behemoth, and Sonata Arctica. They have also performed at the ProgPower USA festival in Atlanta, Georgia, as well as the LoudPark festival in Japan, among many others.

The band went into hiatus in the year 2009 after several members of the "Enter Deception" era lineup left the band. In 2011 after 2 years without any updates, the band quietly released 4 demo songs online from their upcoming EP entitled "Honor Forth." Led by guitarist/songwriter Chris Petersen, the band held continuous auditions for the entirety of 2009–2012 and ultimately reformed with bass player James Pickett, drummer Nick Mccallister, keyboardist Diego Valadez, and guitarist Caleb Delaet. Petersen officially took up the lead vocalist position in 2012.

In December 2012, the band announced new live shows beginning in 2013. They spent the entirety of the year establishing in the Colorado area, and playing one-off shows as guest openers for Havok, Into Eternity, Helloween, Shining, Vale of Pnath, Amaranthe, and others.

In early 2014 long time guitarist, Caleb Delaet, left the band, and afterwards the band began recording the second LP, Off the Grid, which Chris Petersen had to take full control over the guitars for the recording process. Recording for the album was wrapped up in the summer of 2015. In late 2015, guitarist Eric Meyers was brought in to fill the second guitar position. Afterwards they went on to play Denver shows for the remainder of the year. In 2016, Cellador was opening up for bands such as Huntress, Anvil, Queensryche, and more. During the summer of 2016 long time bassist, James Pickett, left the band. Shortly thereafter, Cellador went on to sign with Italian record label Scarlet Records.

In 2017, bassist Chris Davila was temporarily brought in to help with the promotion for their upcoming album, such as performing in live shows and a music video. Off the Grid was officially released on March 10. After their second LP release, Cellador shot a music video for one of the Off the Grid singles, Break Heresy. They went on to open up for acts such as Yngwie Malmsteen, and played in the 2017 Evoken Music Festival in Tokyo and Osaka, Japan. The band is currently in the process of writing and recording a third album.

Band members

Current members 
 Chris Petersen – guitar, vocals (2004–present)
 Diego Valadez – synths (2011–present)
 Nick McCallister – drums (2011–present)
 Eric Meyers – guitar (2015–present)

Former members 
 Sam Chatham – guitar (2004–2005)
 Valentin Rakhmanov – bass (2004–2007)
 Dave Dahir – drums (2004–2007, 2007–2009)
 Bill Hudson – guitar (2005–2008)
 Michael Gremio – vocals (2005–2009)
 Rick Halverson – drums (2007)
 Mika Horiuchi – bass (2007–2009)
 Yord – guitar (2008–2009)
 Caleb Delaet – guitar (2012–2014)
 James Pickett – bass (2011–2016)
 Chris Davila – bass (2017–2018)

Discography 
The Burning Blue (Demo) (2004)
 Leaving All Behind (EP) (2005)
 Enter Deception (2006)
 Honor Forth (EP) (2011)
Off the Grid (2017)

References

External links 
 Official Cellador homepage
Cellador on Reverb Nation
Official Cellador Myspace
Official Cellador forum
Metal Blade Records

American power metal musical groups
Musical groups from Omaha, Nebraska
Musical groups established in 2004
Heavy metal musical groups from Nebraska
Metal Blade Records artists
Scarlet Records artists